"Money, Money" is the first single from the album Thug World Order by the group Bone Thugs-n-Harmony, released in 2002.  The Cleveland group was inspired by an original Ohio Player, Dutch Robinson's solo album (Nothin's Got Me), 1977.  "Money, Money" includes a sample from that album's "I Ain't Got Nothin".

It was the only video from the album to include Bizzy Bone, who left the group shortly after the release of the album. Some music channels would not play the video as they thought it promoted robbery.

Charts

2002 singles
Bone Thugs-n-Harmony songs
2002 songs
Ruthless Records singles
Songs written by Layzie Bone
Songs written by Bizzy Bone
Songs written by Wish Bone
Songs written by Krayzie Bone